Ludon-Médoc is a commune in the Gironde department in the Nouvelle-Aquitaine region in Southwestern France. In 2019, it had a population of 5,131.

Demographics

See also
Communes of the Gironde department

References

Communes of Gironde